Maria Luz Lilet Navarro Jodloman-Esteban professionally known as Lilet is a Filipino singer, television host, actress, and model. She is known as The Muse Of OPM (Original Pilipino Music).

Career
As among the Filipino endorsers of Coca-Cola, Lilet first appeared in an international commercial, singing Tomorrow's People, which was shot in Liverpool, England.

Her first musical album was entitled Lonely Girl, produced by GOI Records. Lilet's second album, (This Song's) Dedicated to You, was produced by Viva Records. Her third and fourth album, Kahit Minsan Lang and Lilet in Bloom, both under Alpha Records, included revivals of the classic OPM songs "Tulak Ng Bibig, Kabig Ng Dibdib" and "Kaibigan Lang Pala".

Lilet joined That's Entertainment, appeared in movies such as Aso't Pusa, Estudyante Blues, Dear Diary and Pik Pak Boom. After a break to pursue studies in Japan, she released a comeback album with Ivory Music in 2003, under the name Marielle.

She joined A Song Of Praise (ASOP) as a composer and her song, "You Are Lord Of All", won Song of the Month in July 2014, the first one to garner a 99% score in the history of ASOP. She went on to compete in the grand finals on September 23, 2014 at the Smart Araneta Coliseum, where the song was performed by Ava Olivia Santos of Freestyle. She was invited as guest performer at the ASOP 2015 grand finals.

On August 4, 2014, Lilet guested on ABS-CBN's The Singing Bee. This started her career in TV series, the first of which was Forevermore, followed by Langit Lupa, and A Love to Last. She has a supporting role in My Special Tatay, aired on GMA Network. This marked her television comeback in her mother studio where she first started and became a popular singer in the 80s to early 90s.

Lilet had a jam session, "A Throwback Night", with ROCKOLAROCKOLA on October 21, 2017, singing hit songs of the 80s.

She was one of the surprise guests in Coke Studio's Homecoming last September 1, 2018 at the World Trade Center, singing a mash-up of their commercial jingle together with Nikki Gil and Abra.

Lilet is currently under Cornerstone Talent Management Center, and one of the endorsers of Marie France Philippines.

She always says in her posts: #WORKISBLESSING.

Filmography

Film

Television

Discography

Studio albums
Lonely Girl (1986)
(This Song's) Dedicated to You (1988)
Lilet – Sana Kahit Minsan Lang (1990) / (Gold Record Award)
Lilet in Bloom (1992) 
Marielle – Sa Paglisan Mo (2003)

References

External links
Whatever Happened to these '80s Stars/Starlets/Lilets?

80s singer Lilet returns to showbiz via her first teleserye Forevermore
Loading...

1974 births
Living people
21st-century Filipino women singers
Filipino film actresses
That's Entertainment Friday Group Members
GMA Network personalities
TV5 (Philippine TV network) personalities
ABS-CBN personalities
Filipino television actresses